Morgan Faßbender (born 18 October 1998) is a German professional footballer who plays as a midfielder for  club SV Meppen.

Career

Early career
Born in Stuttgart, Faßbender played youth football for VfB Stuttgart, SSV Ulm 1846, SGV Freiberg and Stuttgarter Kickers. He started his senior career at SGV Freiberg, where he made 8 appearances in the second half of the 2017–18 season. He left the club at the end of the season. He joined FV Illertissen in the Regionalliga Bayern in September 2018, where he made 3 appearances before joining Göppinger SV in early 2019. He scored twice in 14 appearances across the remainder of the 2018–19 season whilst he scored 2 goals in 15 matches during the 2019–20 season.

Chemie Leipzig
In July 2020, he signed for Chemie Leipzig on a one-year contract with the option of an additional year. He scored four goals in 12 appearances during the 2020–21 season. At the end of the season, Faßbender was offered a new contract by the club but initially rejected it to search for new club. He subsequently asked to remain at the club but was released as the club had recruited new players in his position.

SV Meppen
He signed a two-year contract with 3. Liga side SV Meppen on 17 June 2021. He made his debut for the club in a 3–1 defeat to Hallescher FC on 24 July 2021.

Career statistics

References

External links

1998 births
Living people
German footballers
Footballers from Stuttgart
Association football midfielders
Stuttgarter Kickers players
FV Illertissen players
BSG Chemie Leipzig (1997) players
SV Meppen players
3. Liga players
Regionalliga players
Oberliga (football) players
German people of Ghanaian descent